Juniper Cove is a cove in the Salem Channel, within the city limits of Salem, Massachusetts. The Salem Neck coast that borders Juniper Cove is mostly populated by residential areas.

References

Coves of the United States
Bays of Essex County, Massachusetts
Salem, Massachusetts
Bays of Massachusetts